Irving Township may refer to:

 Irving Township, Montgomery County, Illinois
 Irving Township, Brown County, Kansas
 Irving Township, Michigan
 Irving Township, Kandiyohi County, Minnesota
 Irving Township, Faulk County, South Dakota, in Faulk County, South Dakota

Township name disambiguation pages